East Curthwaite is a hamlet in Cumbria, England. Meaning "Clearing near or belonging to a church", it was documented as "Kyrkthwate" in 1272.

See also

Listed buildings in Westward, Cumbria

References

Hamlets in Cumbria
Allerdale